is a Japanese freestyle swimmer.

Major achievements
2005 World Championships 
200m freestyle 17th (1:49.42)
400m freestyle 14th (3:50.17)
800m freestyle 13th (7:58.00)
4 × 200 m freestyle relay 5th　(7:13.60)
2008 Beijing Olympics
200m freestyle 24th (1:48.34)
4 × 200 m freestyle relay 7th (Heat 7:09.12 AS, Final 7:10.31) 
2009 World Championships
200m freestyle 4th (1:45.24) Japanese Record
400m freestyle 25th (3:50.16)

Personal bests
In long course
 200m freestyle: 1:45.24 Japanese Record (July 28, 2009)
 400m freestyle: 3:50.17 (July 24, 2005)

References
 http://www.joc.or.jp/beijing/athlete/aquatics/uchidasyo.html

1987 births
Living people
Olympic swimmers of Japan
Swimmers at the 2008 Summer Olympics
People from Takasaki, Gunma
Asian Games medalists in swimming
Swimmers at the 2010 Asian Games
Japanese male freestyle swimmers
Universiade medalists in swimming
Asian Games silver medalists for Japan
Medalists at the 2010 Asian Games
Universiade gold medalists for Japan
Universiade silver medalists for Japan
Universiade bronze medalists for Japan
Medalists at the 2009 Summer Universiade
Medalists at the 2011 Summer Universiade
21st-century Japanese people